Private car may refer to:
 A class of small motor vehicle (e.g. for car registration, driving licence)
 Private railroad car